Glenea rufopunctata is a species of beetle in the family Cerambycidae. It was described by Charles Joseph Gahan in 1907. It is known from Sumatra. It contains the varietas Glenea rufopunctata var. semifusca.

References

rufopunctata
Beetles described in 1907